Citizens' Alliance (early 1900s) was the name for local anti-trade union groups which united in October 1903 under the banner of the Citizens Industrial Association of America.

Citizens' Alliance is a common name of political and community organizations.

Citizens' Alliance may also refer to:

Political parties 
 Citizens Alliance (Iraq), also known as Al-Muwatin, Shia political coalition and third biggest in Iraqi Parliament after the 2014 elections 
 Citizens' Alliance (Trinidad and Tobago)
 Oregon Citizens Alliance, social conservative political association in the American state of Oregon
 Citizens' Alliance (Cyprus), centre-left party in Cyprus